Yanyshevo (Yanış) is a rural locality (a selo) in Yanyshevsky Selsoviet, Blagovarsky District, Bashkortostan, Russia. The population was 403 as of 2010. There are 7 streets.

Geography 
Yanyshevo is located 34 km north of Yazykovo (the district's administrative centre) by road. Sharlyk is the nearest rural locality.

References 

Rural localities in Blagovarsky District